Vichy – Charmeil Airport  is an airport located in Charmeil,  north-northwest of Vichy, both communes in the Allier department of the Auvergne region in central France.

Facilities

References 

Airports in Auvergne-Rhône-Alpes
Buildings and structures in Allier